Hippolyte Rocks is a small granite island, with an area of 5.3 ha, in south-eastern Australia.  It is part of the Tasman Island Group, lying close to the south-eastern coast of Tasmania around the Tasman Peninsula.  It has a flat top and is surrounded by steep cliffs up to 65 m in height.  It is part of the Tasman National Park.

Fauna
Recorded breeding seabird species are little penguin, short-tailed shearwater, sooty shearwater, fairy prion, common diving-petrel, silver gull and black-faced cormorant.  Australian fur seals use the island as a haul-out site.  The metallic skink is present.  Together, Hippolyte rocks and the nearby Thumbs have been identified by BirdLife International as an Important Bird Area (IBA) because they support over 1% of the world population of black-faced cormorants.

References

Islands of Tasmania
Important Bird Areas of Tasmania
Seabird colonies